Sargocentron shimuzui, or Shimizu's squirrelfish, is a species of squirrelfish belonging to the genus of Sargocentron. It is named after ichthyologist Takeshi Shimizu. It is known from only 2 specimens that were taken with dynamite in Sulawesi, Indonesia in 1909.

References

shimizui
Fish of the Pacific Ocean
Taxa named by John Ernest Randall